Not all cyclists were competing for the victory in the 1907 Tour de France, some only joined as tourists. The most notable of them was Henri Pépin. Pépin had hired two riders, Jean Dargassies and Henri Gauban to ride with him. They treated the race as a pleasure ride, stopping for lunch when they chose and spending the night in the best hotels they could find. Dargassies and Gaubin became the first cyclists in the history of the Tour de France to ride not for their own placings but for their team leader's interest. During the race, they found another Tour de France competitor, Jean-Marie Teychenne, lying in a ditch. They helped him get up, fed him, and from that moment Teycheime was also helping Pépin.

As in the previous years, there were two classes of cyclists, the coureurs de vitesse and the coureurs sur machines poinçonnées. Of the 93 cyclists starting the race, 82 were in the poinçonnée category, which meant that they had to finish the race on the same bicycle as they left, and if it was broken they had to fix it without assistance. The coureurs de vitesse could get help from the car with bicycle repairmen when they had to fix a bicycle, and when a bicycle was beyond repair, they could change it to a new one.

Although the riders officially rode the Tour as individuals, some had the same sponsor and cooperated as if they rode in teams. At the start of the race, it was clear that the riders sponsored by Alcyon and the riders sponsored by Peugeot would compete for the overall victory. Alcyon started with three main contenders: Louis Trousselier, Marcel Cadolle and Léon Georget; Peugeot counted on Emile Georget.

By starting number

By nationality

References

Notes
1.His real name was Dargaties but the Tour spelled his name wrongly and the error stuck.

1907 Tour de France
1907